The 2011 Norwegian Football Cup Final was the 106th final of the Norwegian Football Cup. It was played on 6 November 2011 at Ullevaal Stadion, in Oslo, Norway. In the final Brann meet Aalesund. The winner, Aalesund, earned a place in the second qualifying round of the 2012–13 UEFA Europa League. The draw for the final was held on 27 September 2011 by the Norwegian Football Association, which decided that Brann was the home team of the final and got to play in their red home kits. UEFA-president Michel Platini came to Oslo and watched the final.

Background
Up to the 2011 final, Brann had reached the Cup Final fourteen times, winning six of them, while Aalesund had won the only Final they played in 2009.
The first league match of the Tippeliga-season, ended 1–1 at Brann Stadion. The second league match will be played after the Final. In the last ten years, Brann and Aalesund had been drawn together in the Norwegian Cup twice, each winning one tie; in the Fifth Round in 2002, Aalesund, who played on the second-tier that year, won the penalty shootout 6-5 after 120 minutes with 0–0 at Brann Stadion; Aalesund went on to reach the semi-final. Their next meeting was 3 years later, in the Fourth Round of the 2005 competition; Brann won the match 3-2 but were eliminated in the quarter-final.

Pre-match

Officials 
Hamar-based referee Svein-Erik Edvartsen was named as the referee for the 2011 Cup Final on 10 October 2011. Edvartsen states that this will be his biggest experience as a referee. Edvartsen has no previous assignments as the primary referee at Ullevaal Stadion, but have been a FIFA-elected referee between 2007 and 2008 and have since 2005 refereed 95 Tippeliga-matches.

His assistants for the 2011 final was Odd-Jarle Hansen, representing Fløy, Magnus Lundberg from Ringsaker, with Brevik Fotball's Anders Johansen as the fourth official.

Route to the final

(TL) = Tippeligaen team
(D1) = 1. divisjon team
(D2) = 2. divisjon team
(D3) = 3. divisjon team

Pre-match

Tickets
The two clubs received 13,000 of the 25,500 tickets to the Final. Since Brann have a higher average home attendance then Aalesund, they get 7,032 tickets while Aalesund gets 5,968 tickets. 2,500 tickets were available for all through sale, while the remaining 10,000 tickets went to partners of the Norwegian Football Association.

Match

See also
2011 Norwegian Football Cup
2011 Tippeligaen
2011 in Norwegian football

References

2011
SK Brann matches
Aalesunds FK matches
Football Cup
November 2011 sports events in Europe
Sports competitions in Oslo
2010s in Oslo
Final